Bazarhaye Rouze Kowsar Isfahan Futsal Club is an Iranian professional futsal club based in Isfahan.

History 

On 8 December 2020, the officials of Bazarhaye Rouze Kowsar established the club by buying the points of Hyper Shahr, which was on the verge of bankruptcy, and participated in the 2020–21 Iranian Futsal Super League.

Season-by-season 
The table below chronicles the achievements of the Club in various competitions.

Last updated: July 1, 2021

Notes:
* unofficial titles
1 worst title in history of club

Key

P   = Played
W   = Games won
D   = Games drawn
L   = Games lost

GF  = Goals for
GA  = Goals against
Pts = Points
Pos = Final position

Players

Current squad

Personnel

Current technical staff

Last updated: January 8, 2022

Managers

Last updated: July 1, 2021

References 

Futsal clubs in Iran
Sport in Isfahan
2020 establishments in Iran